César Augusto Rivas Lasso (born 28 June 1979) is a retired footballer who played as a striker. Born and raised in Colombia, he was naturalized by Equatorial Guinea and played for the latter's national team.

Club career
Rivas has played for Deportes Tolima, Independiente Medellín, Deportivo Pereira and Fortaleza in Colombia; for Alfonso Ugarte in Peru and for The Panthers in Equatorial Guinea.

External links

1979 births
Living people
Sportspeople from Cauca Department
Equatoguinean footballers
Equatorial Guinea international footballers
Colombian footballers
Equatoguinean people of Colombian descent
Association football forwards
Deportes Tolima footballers
Independiente Medellín footballers
Deportivo Pereira footballers
Colombian expatriate footballers
Colombian expatriate sportspeople in Peru
Expatriate footballers in Peru
Naturalized citizens of Equatorial Guinea